"Don't Mind" is a song by American recording artist Mary J. Blige, from her tenth studio album, My Life II... The Journey Continues (Act 1) (2011). It was written by Blige along with Priscilla Renea Jerry Duplessis Keith Duplessis and Arden Altino, while production helmed by the latter. The song was released as the album's fourth and final single on June 19, 2012 in the United States, where it reached number 35 on the US Billboard Hot R&B/Hip Hop Songs chart.

Background
"Don't Mind" was written by Blige, Priscilla Renea and Jerry Duplessis. Production on the track was also handled by Duplessis under his pseudonym Wonda. Blige's vocals were recorded by Serge "Sergical" Tsai, while Jaycen Joshua mixed the track.

Music video
The music video for "Don't Mind" was directed by Colin Tilley. It features Blige dressed in a black cat suit singing about how she doesn’t mind telling her man she loves him. Singing straight to camera, she is seen performing in front of a graffiti laced wall.

Credits and personnel
Credits adapted from the liner notes of My Life II... The Journey Continues (Act 1).

Songwriting – Mary J. Blige, Priscilla Renea, Jerry Duplessis
Production – Jerry Wonda
Recording – Serge "Sergical" Tsai
Mixing – Jaycen Joshua
Mastering – Dave Kutch

Charts

References

External links
 MaryJBlige.com — official site

2012 singles
Mary J. Blige songs
2011 songs
Songs written by Muni Long
Songs written by Jerry Duplessis
Song recordings produced by Jerry Duplessis
Songs written by Mary J. Blige
Geffen Records singles
Music videos directed by Colin Tilley